Althea V. Stevens (January 2, 1983) is an American politician who has represented the 16th district on the New York City Council since 2022. Her district encompasses the South Bronx communities of Morrisania, Concourse, Highbridge, and Morris Heights.

Early life and education 
A native of New York City, Stevens graduated from Hunter College. Before her election to the City Council, Stevens was a member of the New York City Housing Authority (NYCHA) Tenants Association.

Career 
Before her election to the City Council, Stevens was a member of the New York City Housing Authority (NYCHA) Tenants Association.

New York City Council 
Stevens was a successful candidate for the New York City Council in the 2021 election. During her candidacy for office, Stevens endorsed reducing the New York City Police Department's (NYPD) budget by a minimum of $1 million. Stevens' campaign was endorsed by the Working Families Party (WFP).

On the council, she chairs the Committee on Youth Services, which has jurisdiction over the Department of Youth and Community Development.

Personal life 
Stevens owns two turtles, named Purple and Squirt.

References 

New York City Council members
Hunter College alumni
1983 births
Living people
African-American New York City Council members